Italy competed at the 1989 Summer Universiade in Duisburg, West Germany and won 30 medals.

Medals

Details

References

External links
 Universiade (World University Games)
 WORLD STUDENT GAMES (UNIVERSIADE - MEN)
 WORLD STUDENT GAMES (UNIVERSIADE - WOMEN)

1989
1989 in Italian sport
Italy